Li Jiang may refer to:

Li Jiang (born 764), Tang dynasty official
, Chinese politician
Li Jiang (born 1958), Chinese politician

See also
 Lijiang (disambiguation)